Dunboyne was an American Thoroughbred racehorse. Ridden by William Donohue for owner, breeder and trainer William Jennings Sr., Dunboyne won the 1887 Preakness Stakes.

References

1884 racehorse births
Racehorses bred in the United States
Racehorses trained in the United States
Preakness Stakes winners
Thoroughbred family 2-a
Byerley Turk sire line